Crooked Alley is a 1923 American crime film directed by Robert F. Hill and written by Adrian Johnson and Robert F. Hill. The film stars Thomas Carrigan, Laura La Plante, Tom Guise, Owen Gorin and Al Hart. The film was released on November 7, 1923, by Universal Pictures.

Cast          
Thomas Carrigan as Boston Blackie
Laura La Plante as Norine Tyrell / Olive Sloan
Tom Guise as Judge Milnar 
Owen Gorin as Rudy Milnar 
Al Hart as Kaintuck

References

External links
 

1923 films
1920s English-language films
American crime films
1923 crime films
Universal Pictures films
Films directed by Robert F. Hill
American silent feature films
American black-and-white films
1920s American films